This is a list of California Community Colleges, made up of 115 colleges within the California Community Colleges system.

Ranking

References

See also

Community Colleges
California Community Colleges